The Multi-Color Graphics Array or MCGA is a video subsystem built into the motherboard of the IBM PS/2 Model 30, introduced on April 2, 1987, and Model 25, introduced later on August 11; no standalone MCGA cards were ever made.

The MCGA supports all CGA display modes plus 640×480 monochrome at a refresh rate of 60 Hz, and 320×200 with 256 colors (out of a 18-bit RGB palette of 262,144) at 70 Hz. The display adapter uses a DE-15 connector.

MCGA is similar to VGA in that it had a 256-color mode (the 256-color mode in VGA was sometimes referred to as MCGA) and uses 15-pin analog connectors. The PS/2 chipset's limited abilities prevents EGA compatibility and high-resolution multi-color VGA display modes.

The tenure of MCGA was brief; the PS/2 Model 25 and Model 30 were discontinued by 1992, and no manufacturer produced a clone of this display adapter except for Epson Equity Ie and Epson PSE-30, since the VGA standard introduced at the same time was considered superior.

Software support
The 256-color mode proved most popular for gaming. 256-color VGA games ran fine on MCGA as long as they stuck to the basic 320×200 256-color mode and didn't attempt to use VGA-specific features such as multiple screen pages.

Games lacking support for 256-color graphics were forced to fall back to four-color CGA mode (or not run at all) due to the incompatibility with EGA video modes (320×200 in 16 colors, as well as sometimes 640x200 or 640x350). Some games, including point-and-click adventures from Sierra On-line and Lucasfilm Games, as well as simulation and strategy titles from Microprose solved this problem for low-resolution titles by supporting MCGA in its 320×200 256-color mode and picking the colors most resembling the EGA 16-color RGB palette, while leaving the other available colors in that mode unused. Higher resolution titles were often unsupported unless graphics could be converted into either MCGA low or high (640x480 monochrome, which would also support 640x400 and 640x350 graphics with some letterboxing) in an acceptable fashion. An alternative approach used by a small number of (generally earlier) games was to use 4-colour CGA assets but make use of the adaptor's ability to freely change each of the palette colours for a slightly enhanced appearance.

Output capabilities
MCGA offered:
640×480 monochrome (Mode 11h)
320×200 in 256 colors (from a palette of 262,144) (Mode 13h)

CGA compatible modes:
40×25 text mode with 8×8 pixel font (effective resolution of 320×200) (Mode 0/1h)
80×25 text mode with 8×8 pixel font (effective resolution of 640×200) (Mode 2/3h)
320×200 in 4 colors from a 16 color hardware palette. Pixel aspect ratio of 1:1.2. (Mode 4/5h)
640×200 in 2 colors. Pixel aspect ratio of 1:2.4 (Mode 6h)

See also
List of defunct graphics chips and card companies

References

 

Computer display standards
Multicolor Graphics Adapter
Products introduced in 1987
IBM PS/2